Love, Andy is the twenty-first studio album by American pop singer Andy Williams, released on October 16, 1967, by Columbia Records to coincide with the NBC special of the same name, which aired on November 6. The LP had a mix of covers of old and recent hits that included two songs from the 1940s that also had chart success in 1966 via Chris Montez: "The More I See You" and "There Will Never Be Another You".

The album made its first appearance on Billboard magazine's Top LP's chart in the issue dated November 18 and remained there for 36 weeks, peaking at number eight.  It entered the UK album chart in May 1968 and spent one week at number one over the course of 22 weeks,  and the  Recording Industry Association of America awarded the album Gold certification on May 14 of that year.

In the US, the single released from the album, "Holly", first appeared on the Easy Listening chart in the issue of Billboard dated October 28, 1967, and peaked at number four during a 16-week stay.  The song also began to "bubble under" the Hot 100 in the issue dated November 18, 1967, and eventually reached number 113.  In the UK the song chosen as the single for release was a cover of Frankie Valli's "Can't Take My Eyes off You", and it entered the singles chart there for the week of March 16, 1968, stayed around for 18 weeks, and got as high as number five. Williams revisited the song in 2002 as a duet with Denise Van Outen that reached number 23 in the UK.
    
The album was released on compact disc for the first time as one of two albums on one CD by Sony Music Distribution in 1995, the other album being Williams's Columbia release from the spring of 1963, Days of Wine and Roses and Other TV Requests (under its UK title, Can't Get Used to Losing You and Other Requests).  It was also released as one of two albums on one CD by Collectables Records on March 23, 1999, paired this time with Williams's Columbia album from the spring of 1967, Born Free. This CD was included in a box set entitled Classic Album Collection, Vol. 1, which contains 17 of his studio albums and three compilations and was released on June 26, 2001.

Reception
Allmusic's William Ruhlmann described the current stage of the Williams oeuvre: "The singer had edged more toward contemporary sounds on his previous release, the previous spring's Born Free, bringing in a rock rhythm section and sticking to current material. Love, Andy edged back a bit, focusing more on string arrangements." He found this combination of songs to be "a balanced collection, not unlike a variety show on record made by an artist mindful of trying to appeal to the widest audience possible."

Billboard said that "Williams is in fine fettle as he plies romance with some topflight ballads of pop and standard character."

Track listing

Side one
 "Somethin' Stupid" (C. Carson Parks) – 2:59
 "Watch What Happens" from The Umbrellas of Cherbourg (Norman Gimbel, Michel Legrand) – 2:27
 "The Look of Love" from Casino Royale (Burt Bacharach, Hal David) – 2:55
 "What Now, My Love?" (Gilbert Bécaud, Pierre Delanoë, Carl Sigman) – 2:05
 "Can't Take My Eyes off You" (Bob Crewe, Bob Gaudio) – 3:15
 "Kisses Sweeter Than Wine" (Paul Campbell, Joel Newman) – 2:52

Side two
 "Holly" (Craig Vincent Smith) – 2:25
 "When I Look in Your Eyes" from Doctor Dolittle (Leslie Bricusse) – 3:22
 "The More I See You" from Diamond Horseshoe (Mack Gordon, Harry Warren) – 2:25
 "There Will Never Be Another You" from Iceland (Mack Gordon, Harry Warren) – 2:53
 "God Only Knows" (Tony Asher, Brian Wilson) – 2:52

Chart positions

Personnel
From the liner notes for the original album:

Andy Williams - vocals
Nick DeCaro - arranger, producer
Eddie Karam - conductor
Lincoln Mayorga - piano ("God Only Knows")
Rafael O. Valentin - recording engineer
Frank Laico - recording engineer
Peter Whorf - photographer

References

Bibliography

1967 albums
Andy Williams albums
Columbia Records albums